Stipe Bralić (born June 10, 1973) is a Croatian professional basketball coach who is the head coach of ŽKK Šibenik and the senior women's Croatia national team, which he led at the 2012 Summer Olympics in London.

References

1973 births
Living people
Basketball players from Šibenik
Croatian basketball coaches
ŽKK Šibenik coaches